Death on the Reik is a 1987 role-playing game adventure for Warhammer Fantasy Roleplay published by Games Workshop.

Contents
Death on the Reik is a boxed module in which the player characters, having escaped from Bogenhafen, find themselves in need of transportation and so take to the river.

Reception
Phil Gallagher reviewed Death on the Reik for White Dwarf #93, and stated that "The conclusion to the adventure should provide more than a few tense moments for the players, not to mention a shock or two. But I'm not to going to give any more than that away... except to say that the adventure certainly ends with a bang!"

Richard A. Edwards reviewed Death on the Reik in Space Gamer/Fantasy Gamer No. 82. Edwards commented that "The graphical presentation of this series is amazing. The detailed castle map is useable in any gaming situation which could require one and the river material is likewise useable in other systems. But the real value of this package is as part of the continuing saga of The Enemy Within."

Reviews
White Wolf #9 (1988)
Arcane #15

References

Role-playing game supplements introduced in 1987
Warhammer Fantasy Roleplay adventures